Nancy Fuller (also known as Nancy Fuller Ginsberg or Nancy Ginsberg; born March 27, 1949) is an American chef and businesswoman from Claverack, New York. She is the co-owner of Ginsberg's Foods, and the host of the Food Network television series Farmhouse Rules. She also serves as a judge on the Food Network cooking competition series Clash of the Grandmas, Holiday Baking Championship and Spring Baking Championship.

Personal life
Fuller lives in the Hudson Valley of New York with her husband David Ginsberg. She leases out her dairy farm in Copake, New York. She has six children and thirteen grandchildren.

References

External links
  (official website)

1949 births
American food industry businesspeople
American television chefs
Food Network chefs
Living people
People from Claverack, New York
American women chefs
21st-century American women
Santa Ana College alumni